Perali Union is an Union Parishad under Lohagara Upazila of Narail District in the division of Khulna, Bangladesh. It has an area of 56.67 km2 (21.88 sq mi) and a population of 32,112.

References

Unions of Kalia Upazila
Unions of Narail District
Unions of Khulna Division